One Wish: The Holiday Album is the sixth studio album by American singer Whitney Houston. It was released by Arista Records on November 18, 2003. Chiefly produced by Mervyn Warren, the album is a follow-up to her fifth studio album, Just Whitney (2002), as well as her first Christmas album. One Wish features cover versions of Christmas standards and carols, one of which is a duet with Houston's daughter Bobbi Kristina Brown. The album also includes "Joy to the World" and "Who Would Imagine a King," both of which first appeared on The Preacher's Wife soundtrack (1996).

The album received a mixed reception by music critics, many of whom praised the production but were divided upon Houston's vocal performance. Upon its release, One Wish debuted at number 49 on the US Billboard 200, and at number 13 on Billboards Top R&B/Hip-Hop Albums chart. Its first and only single, a rendition of Freddie Jackson's "One Wish (for Christmas)", reached the top twenty on Billboards US Adult Contemporary chart. In January 2018, the album was certified Gold by the Recording Industry Association of America (RIAA) for sales over 500,000 copies.

Critical reception

AllMusic editor Stephen Thomas Erlewine remarked that "holiday records are the last place anybody would want to take a risk, since they're designed to be nice, pleasant mood music and, apart from a rather horrid version of "Little Drummer Boy" [..] this suits the bill nicely. The clean, pristine production, heavy on synths, sounds as if it was cut in the late '80s, yet it's also strangely spare, often being no more than a synth and a drum machine. Still, it's a sound that's well suited for Whitney and her thoroughly predictable set of material." Moscow-Pullman Daily News wrote that Houston's "voice [...] dazzles on [the album] [...] as she soulfully interprets holiday classics. Her voice – though at times a bit raspy – captivates on every track." New York Times critic Jones Pareles noted the "lavish swoops, the sultry whispers, the gospelly asides and the meteoric crescendos" from Houston.

Caroline Sullivan, writing for The Guardian, noted that "stuff like this is so piddling for her that [Houston] seems to have zoned out halfway through. Why put any elbow grease into the "project" when all she need do is set her larynx to "reverent," then doze off? Saying that, she gives "Have Yourself a Merry Little Christmas" some a cappella welly, and the cocktail doo-wop of "O Come, O Come, Emmanuel" is quite irresistible. Still, this is the Voice at its numbest." Slant critic Sal Cinquemani found that "one can't help but think that One Wish: The Holiday Album is nothing more than damage control [...] Houston's voice just isn’t what it used to be – she warbles her way through an otherwise understated version of the contemporary classic [...] and sings 'Tiny little tots with their eyes all aglow/Will find it hard to sleep tonight' on Mel Tormé's "The Christmas Song" like she wants to eat them." In 2014, Los Angeles Times critic Randy Lewis included One Wish on his listing of the "12 of the worst holiday albums of the last 20 years." He noted that "for this set, Houston seemed intent on shoehorning more notes into each syllable than Mariah Carey, resulting in an orgy of melismatics that often obliterates the spirit of these holiday tunes."

Commercial performance
One Wish: The Holiday Album debuted and peaked at number 49 on the US Billboard 200. It marked Houston's lowest chart opening up to then and was a considerable decline from her previous effort Just Whitney (2002), which had debuted at number nine the year before. On Billboards component charts, it reached number 13 on Billboards Top R&B/Hip-Hop Albums, becoming her first album to miss the top ten, as well as number five on the Top Holiday Albums chart. In January 2018, One Wish was certified Gold by the Recording Industry Association of America (RIAA) for sales in excess of 500,000 units.

Track listing

Personnel
Credits adapted from AllMusic.

 Joey Arbagey – A&R
 Julien Barber – viola
 Ray Bardani – mixing
 Sandra Billingslea – violin
 Ralph Blane –  
 Edie Lehmann Boddicker – background vocals
 Joseph Bongiorno – upright bass
 Alfred Brown – viola
 Ray Brown Trio – primary artist
 Carmen Carter – background vocals
 Gordon Chambers –   producer, vocal arrangement, background vocals
 Bernard Davis – drums
 John Dexter – viola
 Sante d'Orazio – photography
 Earl Dumler – oboe
 Barry J. Eastmond – conductor, engineer, keyboards, producer, string arrangements
 Max Ellen – violin
 Steve Fisher – assistant
 Roxanna Floy – make-Up
 Scott Frankfurt – drum programming, percussion programming
 Ian Freebairn-Smith – background vocals
 Roger Freeland – background vocals
 Michelle George – A&R
 Georgia Mass Choir – primary artist
 Sharlotte Gibson – background vocals
 Sandi Hall – background vocals
 Phil Hamilton – acoustic guitar, electric guitar
 Reggie Hamilton – bass
 John Holmes – assistant
 Ashley Horne – violin
 Gary Houston – background vocals
 Whitney Houston – lead vocals, producer, vocal arrangement
 Regis Iandiorio – violin
 Paul Jackson Jr. – guitar
 Ronald Jenkins – bass
 Richard Thomas Jennings – art direction, design
 Bashiri Johnson – percussion
 Thom "TK" Kidd – engineer
 Olivia Koppell – viola
 Gail Kruvand – bass
 David Kutch – mastering
 Ellin La Var – hair stylist
 Leonid Levin – violin
 Jesse Levy – cello
 Ezekiel Lewis – vocal arrangement, background vocals
 Jason Locklin – assistant
 Stephen Mackey – background vocals
 Joseph Magee – engineer
 Margaret Magill – violin
 Phil Magnotti – string engineer
 Nick Marshall – assistant
 Myrna Matthews – background vocals
 Roger Moody – assistant
 Kermit Moore – cello
 Michael Morton – flute
 Jeff Moses – assistant
 Eugene J. Moye – cello
 Jack Odom – assistant
 Zack Odom – assistant
 Dean Parks – guitar
 Carol Pool – violin
 Dave Reitzas – mixing
 Alex Reverberi – assistant
 Marnie Riley – assistant
 Maxine Roach – viola
 Anthony Ruotolo – assistant
 Matthew Schwartz – a&r
 Tony Shepperd – engineer, mixing
 Rob Skipworth – assistant
 Ivy Skoff – production coordination
 Matt Snedecor – assistant
 Timothy Snell – stylist
 Andy Stein – violin
 Katherine LiVolsi Stern – violin
 Sally Stevens – vocal contractor, background vocals
 Marti Sweet – violin
 Gerald Tarack – concert master, violin
 Craig "Niteman" Taylor – assistant
 Troy Taylor – arranger, bass, drums, keyboards, producer, programming, vocal arrangement, background vocals
 Shelene Thomas – background vocals
 Carmen Twillie – background vocals
 Mervyn Warren – arranger, choir arrangement,   conductor, drum programming, keyboards, percussion, percussion programming, piano, producer, string arrangements, vocals, background vocals
 Oren Waters – background vocals 
 John West – background vocals
 Gerald White – background vocals
 Michael White – engineer
 Belinda Whitney – violin
 Frank Wolf – engineer
 Harry Zaratzian – viola

Charts

Certifications

Release history

References

External links
 One Wish: The Holiday Album at Allmusic
 One Wish: The Holiday Album at Discogs

Whitney Houston albums
2003 Christmas albums
Albums produced by Troy Taylor (record producer)
Christmas albums by American artists
Contemporary R&B Christmas albums
Arista Records Christmas albums
Albums produced by Whitney Houston